Nymphophilus minckleyi is a species of very small freshwater snail, an aquatic gastropod mollusk in the family Hydrobiidae.

Distribution 
This species is endemic to Cuatro Ciénegas valley, in the Chihuahuan Desert, Mexico.

Ecology 
Predators of Mexithauma quadripaludium include the cichlid fish Herichthys minckleyi.

References 

minkleyi
Endemic molluscs of Mexico
Gastropods described in 1966
Mexican Plateau